A state forest in Brazil is a type of sustainable use protected area managed at the state level.
The primary purpose is sustainable exploitation of the forest, subject to various limits.
These include a requirement to preserve at least 50% of the original forest, to preserve forest along watercourses and on steep slopes, and so on.

Definition

The concept of the State Forest originated with the 1934 Forest Code. It is equivalent to a national forest, but is administered at the state level. It is an area with forest cover of predominantly native species and has the basic objective of the sustainable multiple use of forest resources and scientific research, with emphasis on methods for sustainable exploitation of native forests. The forest is publicly owned and any private lands in its boundaries are expropriated when it is formed.
Indigenous populations may remain in the forest.
Public visits are allowed, and research is encouraged, subject to the rules set out by the responsible agency. The responsible agency must prepare and publish a management plan for the forest.

Any new state forests must maintain at least 50% of the original forest coverage, although older forests may have as little as 20%.
Properties in the south of Brazil in which the Paraná pine (Araucaria angustifolia) occurs cannot be deforested. Areas with slopes between 24 and 45 degrees cannot be deforested, but lumber may be extracted without clearcutting. Forests along waterways and around springs, on topographical heights, on slopes of more than 45 degrees, in salt marshes, on the edge of plateaus and above  may not be touched. The minimum amount of wild coverage must be preserved at each level of the property. Industries that use forest products are expected to invest in forests to meet their needs.

Examples

Examples of state forests include:

References

Sources

Environmental law in Brazil
Types of protected area of Brazil